Agelena chayu is a species of spider in the family Agelenidae, which contains at least 1,350 species . It was first described by Zhang, Zhu & Song in 2005. It is native to China.

References

chayu
Spiders of China
Spiders described in 2005